Zagorac is a Serbo-Croatian surname, meaning "man from beyond the mountain". It may refer to:

Danijel Zagorac, Croatian footballer
Milan Zagorac, Serbian footballer
Slavko Zagorac, Serbian footballer
Rade Zagorac, Serbian basketball player
Željko Zagorac, Slovenian basketball player
Saša Zagorac, Slovenian basketball player

Croatian surnames
Serbian surnames